Gregory Wilson is an American magician and two-time FISM award winner. Known as "The Honest Conman," Wilson specializes primarily in close-up magic, sleight-of-hand, and confidence trickery. He is the subject of a chapter in magician Paul Harris's book, Art of Astonishment, Vol. 1.

Wilson is a regular performer at the Magic Castle in Hollywood, but also performs at large corporate events, trade shows and private functions all over the world. He has been featured in numerous televised specials, including a featured role as a "resident wizard" on Syfy's magic series Wizard Wars with Penn & Teller.

Career
Billing himself as a "deception artist," Wilson began development in the mid-1980's on what would eventually become his signature "Criminal Act," with a focus on pick-pocketing, card-sharking, short-changing, street-swindling and mental manipulation. His work in these fields has been so extensive that he has given his Deception Detection lecture to U.S. federal law enforcement agencies (FBI, CIA, ATF, Secret Service, Homeland Security), as well as numerous state and local police departments who have all consulted him on matters related to his areas of expertise.

Publications

Having created nearly 500 original effects as of 2020, Wilson has published numerous books, notes, and videos teaching different types of sleight of hand, mind reading, and pickpocketing. He has also contributed to numerous journals, magazines, and books on the topic of performing magic, including a column for now-defunct The Magic Menu called "Gregory's Greetings."

Wilson's extensive body of work is available for sale all over the world to magicians of intermediate to advanced skill. Although in the earlier years of his career Wilson relied on major magic retailers to make his works available, much of his published content is now available at The Secret Source, a magic learning platform founded by Wilson in 1996.

Wilson has contributed his works to the following (incomplete) list of publications:

 Magic Magazine
 Genii Magazine
 The Linking Ring
 M-U-M (published by The Society of American Magicians)
 Arcane (a French periodical)
 The Penumbra Magazine
 The Magic Menu
 Channel One Magazine
 VANISH Magazine
 Labyrinth (A Journal of Close-Up Magic)
 Magicseen 
 ELIXIR Magazine

Awards and Accolades
Wilson has received numerous accolades for his various magic innovations, as well as awards for competitive performances:

 Third Place, FISM 2000, Close-up Card magic 
 Second Place, FISM 2003, Close-up Card magic 
 Most Creative Magician of the Year, the International Brotherhood of Magicians, 1998

References

External links
 The Secret Source
 Paul Harris, Art of Astonishment

Living people
American magicians
Year of birth missing (living people)
Place of birth missing (living people)